George Sewell (1924-2007) was an English actor.

George Sewell may also refer to:
George Samuel Sewell (1897–1969), British engineer and George Medal recipient
George Sewell (politician) (1855–1916), Australian politician
George Sewell (physician) (died 1726), English physician and writer
George Sewell (Silent Hill), a character from the Japanese horror media franchise Silent Hill
Georgie Sewell, a character in the English TV series Peaky Blinders